The Autorité des marchés financiers (AMF) (English: "Financial Markets Authority") is the stock market regulator in France. The AMF is an independent public body that is responsible for safeguarding investments in financial instruments and in all other savings and investment, as well as maintaining orderly financial markets.

Overview
The Autorité des marchés financiers (AMF) was established by the Financial Security Act of 1 August 2003. It was formed from the merger of the Commission des opérations de bourse (COB), the Conseil des marchés financiers (CMF) and the Conseil de discipline de la gestion financière (CDGF). The AMF is an independent public body with legal personality and financial autonomy, with the duty of:
Safeguard investments in financial instruments and in all other savings and investment vehicles
Ensure that investors receive material information
Maintain orderly financial markets

It falls under the European regulatory umbrella of the Markets in Financial Instruments Directive (MiFID).

Substantial shareholdings
Shareholders are required to notify their holdings to the AMF when their stake exceeds or falls below certain thresholds. According to the act of 26 July 2005 the lowest disclosure threshold is 5% (article l. 233-7 of the commercial code). Pursuant, the same article allows that companies can set additional notification thresholds in their articles of association. In July 2012, after Jacques Delmas-Marsalet took on the interim presidency of the AMF, the competent parliamentary committees gave the green light to the appointment of Gérard Rameix as head of the AMF, replacing Jean-Pierre Jouyet. He was appointed Chairman of the AMF by a decree dated August 1.

See also
Economy of France
Securities Commission
Autorité des marchés financiers (Quebec)

References

External links 
AMF WebSite

Financial regulatory authorities of France
Government agencies of France
Securities and exchange commissions
Regulation in France